Andrew Stevenson (14 March 1897 – 18 June 1968) was a Scotland international rugby union player. He played at the Prop position.

Rugby Union career

Amateur career

He played for Glasgow Academicals

Provincial career

He played for Glasgow District in the inter-city match against Edinburgh District on 2 December 1922.

International career

Stevenson was capped for Scotland 4 times.

He made his international debut against France in the Five Nations match on 2 January 1922 at Colombes.

He played in 3 Five Nation matches the following season:- against France, Wales and England.

References

1897 births
1968 deaths
Scottish rugby union players
Scotland international rugby union players
Rugby union players from Glasgow
Glasgow District (rugby union) players
Glasgow Academicals rugby union players
Rugby union props